Nitromethaqualone is an analogue of methaqualone that has similar sedative and hypnotic properties.
It is significantly more potent (10x) compared to the parent compound; the typical dose is approximately 25 mg.

References 

Sedatives
Quinazolinones
GABAA receptor positive allosteric modulators